The Causeway Institute of Further and Higher Education (informally Causeway Institute or CIFHE) was a third-level educational institution in Northern Ireland, United Kingdom. The Causeway Institute was located on two campuses: Coleraine, County Londonderry and Ballymoney, County Antrim.

History 
The Institute came into being in September 1994 as a result of the merger of two former technical colleges: Coleraine Technical College and the North Antrim College in Ballymoney. In 2007, the institute became part of the newly formed Northern Regional College. NRC was set up following a review of further education in Northern Ireland. By 2007, the Institute had a full-time student population of 1,100 and 5,500 students taking part-time courses. Before the merger, the institute was a recognised Investor in People and accredited as a Cisco Networking Academy, ECDL Centre and ILM Centre. The College rugby team was ranked within the top eight Colleges and Universities in Ireland.

References 

Further education colleges in Northern Ireland
Education in County Londonderry
Education in County Antrim
Educational institutions established in 1994
Coleraine
1994 establishments in Northern Ireland